Yohann Diniz (born 1 January 1978) is a French race walker. He is the current world-record holder for the 50 km race, with a time of 3:32:33, and for the 50,000 metres track walk, with a time of 3:35:27.

Career
He won the gold medal in the 50 km race at the 2006 European Championships in a personal best time of 3:41:39 hours. He then repeated the feat at the 2010 European Championships in a personal best time of 3:40:37 hours.

In 2007 Diniz won the European Race Walking Cup at Royal Leamington Spa with a French record time of 1:18.58 hours. He then won the silver medal in the 50 km race at the 2007 World Championships.

At the 2008 Summer Olympics in Beijing on an extremely humid day, Diniz was forced to withdraw from the 50 km walking race after about 30 km from the starting line because of pain in the stomach and thigh.

In 2009, he achieved the world's best performance for the 50 km walk – 3hr 38 min 45 sec.
 
He set a world record time of 3:35:27 in the 50,000 metres track walk in March 2011, defeating Thierry Toutain's previous world mark, set in 2000, by more than five minutes.

At 2011 IAAF World Championships in Daegu, Diniz was disqualified from the 50 km walk for three red cards.

Diniz improved his 20 km walk time to 1:17:43 hours at the Memorial Mario Albisetti in March 2012, placing second behind Alex Schwazer.

At the 2012 Summer Olympics in London, Diniz was disqualified from the 50 km walk immediately after his arrival at the finish line in eighth position for taking a bottle of water at the 38th kilometer mark outside a zone provided for water replenishments.

At the 2014 European Athletics Championships, Diniz set a new world record for the 50 km walk in 3:32:33, 1 minute 41 seconds faster than the previous record despite stopping to ask for a Portuguese flag – in homage to his late Portuguese grandmother – to wave a few hundred metres from the finishing line.

At the 2015 French national walk championships in Arles, on 8 March 2015, Diniz set a new world record for the 20 km walk in 1:17:02.  His record only lasted a week.  Before it could be officially ratified, it was surpassed by Yusuke Suzuki.

In July 2015, Diniz announced his withdrawal from the upcoming 2015 World Championships in Athletics because of persistent pain in his inguinal ligament that would result in him undergoing an operation soon.

At the 2016 Summer Olympics he led the race, but due to gastrointestinal issues, he fainted multiple times midrace. Nevertheless, he was able to recover and finished in 8th place, six minutes behind the winner.

In 2017 he finally won the 2017 IAAF World Championships in the 50 km walk in London with the second-ever best time on the distance (the best one is also his) : 3 hours 33 minutes and 11 seconds, finishing 8 minutes ahead of the two Japanese competitors who earned the silver and bronze medals. 

In 2019, he competed in the men's 50 kilometres walk at the 2019 World Athletics Championships held in Doha, Qatar. He did not finish his race.

Performance at major championships

References

External links

1978 births
Living people
French male racewalkers
Athletes (track and field) at the 2008 Summer Olympics
Athletes (track and field) at the 2012 Summer Olympics
Athletes (track and field) at the 2016 Summer Olympics
Olympic athletes of France
People from Épernay
French people of Portuguese descent
French people of Brazilian descent
World Athletics record holders
World Athletics Championships medalists
European Athletics Championships medalists
World Athletics Championships athletes for France
Sportspeople from Marne (department)
World Athletics Championships winners
Athletes (track and field) at the 2005 Mediterranean Games
Mediterranean Games competitors for France
Athletes (track and field) at the 2020 Summer Olympics